

The Continental Copters El Tomcat was a 1950s American single-seat agricultural helicopter converted from a Bell 47G by Continental Copters of Fort Worth Texas. The first helicopter (the El Tomcat II) first flew in 1959 and was followed by a number of variants.

Variants
El Tomcat Mk.II Bell 47G-2 modified extensively for agricultural spraying. First flew in April 1959.
El Tomcat Mk.IIIImproved version of the Mk.II, it first flew in April 1965.
El Tomcat Mk.IIIAPowered by the Franklin 6V4-200, 6V-335, or 6V-350 engines.
El Tomcat Mk.IIIBFeatured a modified fiberglass nose with a repositioned windscreen and a lower cabin roof, and was powered by the 235 hp Franklin 6V-350-A. Produced in 1967.
El Tomcat Mk.IIICImproved version with 200 hp Franklin 6V4-200-C32, 210 hp 6V-335-A, or 235 hp 6V-350-A engines.
El Tomcat Mk.VFirst flown in June 1968, it was powered by a 220 hp Lycoming VO-435-A1A.
El Tomcat Mk.V-APowered by a 260 hp Lycoming VO-435-A1F with a foldable jump-seat.
El Tomcat Mk.V-BPowered by a 265 hp Lycoming VO-435-B1A.

Specifications (V-A)

References

See also

1950s United States agricultural aircraft
1950s United States helicopters
Aircraft first flown in 1959
Single-engined piston helicopters